Ompakoya is a settlement in the Omusati Region of northern Namibia.

References

Populated places in the Omusati Region